Beautiful Secret (Chinese: 美丽的秘密) is a 2015–2016 Chinese television series starring Victoria Song and Peter Ho. It aired on Hunan TV from 21 December 2015 to 12 January 2016. The drama achieved the highest average viewership ratings for the first half of 2016 in China.

Synopsis 
The love story between music producer Guan Yi and aspiring singer Jiang Meili, who hides a shocking birth secret.

Cast
Victoria Song as Jiang Meili
Peter Ho as Guan Yi
Zhang Xianzi as Xu Roulin
Shawn Wei as Cheng Weifeng
Li Ying as Wang Xuan
Ivy Shao as Jiang Meiyan
Ji Ning as Zhang Quan
Zhao Rui as Sun Jinsheng
Huang Li as Jiang Weiguo
Xiong Xiaowen as Chen Jingzhu
Novia Lin as Sha Sha
Li Zi as Song Yiqiang
Xu He as CEO Li

Soundtrack

Ratings 

 Highest ratings are marked in red, lowest ratings are marked in blue

References

2015 Chinese television series debuts
2016 Chinese television series endings
Chinese romantic comedy television series
Chinese music television series